Daniel McBride aka Dirty Dan McBride (November 20, 1945 – July 23, 2009) was an American singer-songwriter and guitarist.

Early life
Born Daniel Hatton in Somerville, Massachusetts, and raised in Reading, Massachusetts, McBride graduated from Reading Memorial High School, class of 1963 and from Boston University College of Communication in 1970.

Career
McBride and his group, the Cavaliers, were popular in the early/mid 60's Boston music scene, but McBride later became widely known as lead guitarist for Sha Na Na during their heyday and on their own TV series of the same name. He appeared in the film Grease in 1978 with Sha Na Na, enjoyed success with other bands and as a solo artist, appeared as an actor and voice-over performer, and was a published writer of humorous pieces for magazines.  He died in his sleep on July 23, 2009, in Los Angeles.

References

1945 births
2009 deaths
American singer-songwriters
American rock songwriters
American rock singers
American rock guitarists
American male guitarists
Sha Na Na members
20th-century American singers
20th-century American guitarists
20th-century American male musicians
People from Somerville, Massachusetts
People from Reading, Massachusetts
Boston University College of Communication alumni
American male singer-songwriters